Shitab (also Romanized as Shītāb; also known as Shīrlūb) is a village in Shitab Rural District, Mugarmun District, Landeh County, Kohgiluyeh and Boyer-Ahmad Province, Iran. At the 2006 census, its population was 430, in 76 families.

References 

Populated places in Landeh County